MV may refer to:

Businesses and organizations

In transportation
 Motor vessel, a motorized ship; used as a prefix for ship names
 MV Agusta, a motorcycle manufacturer based in Cascina Costa, Italy
 Armenian International Airways (IATA code MV)
 Metropolitan-Vickers, an electrical equipment and vehicle manufacturer
 Midland Valley Railroad, United States (reporting mark MV)

Other organizations
 Mieterverband, a Swiss tenant organization
 Millennium Volunteers, a former UK government initiative
 Minnesota Vikings, an American football team
 Miss Venezuela, a beauty pageant
 Museum Victoria, an organization which operates three major state-owned museums in Melbourne, Victoria, Australia

Places
 Martha's Vineyard, an island located south of Cape Cod in Massachusetts
 Maldives (ISO 3166-1 alpha-2 country code MV)
 Mecklenburg-Vorpommern, a German state at the Baltic Sea
 Mountain View, a city in California, US

People
 M. Visvesvaraya, Indian engineer and statesman commonly known as Sir MV

In science and technology

Biology and medicine
 Maedi-visna, a sheep disease
 Malvidin, an anthocyanidin
 Measles virus
 Mechanical ventilation
 Minute volume, the volume of air that can be inhaled or exhaled in one minute
 Mitral valve, a valve in the heart connecting the left atrium and left ventricle

Computing
 mv (Unix), a Unix command that moves one or more files or directories from one place to another
 .mv, top level domain country code for the Republic of Maldives
 MainView, a business automation software
 Materialized view, a database object that contains the results of a query

Other uses in science and technology
 MV, the abbreviation for megavolt, or 1,000,000 volts, a measure of electrical potential
 Mendelevium, a chemical element with former symbol Mv
 mV, millivolt: 1/1,000 of a volt, a measure of electrical potential
 mv (mass × velocity), momentum in physics
 Mv, viscosity average molar mass, a method to quantify molar mass distribution in chemistry
 Mesovortex, a small scale vortex aloft within atmospheric convection, such as squall lines and tropical cyclones
 Microwave, (occasionally) in the field of satellite remote sensing
 MV is the absolute magnitude of a celestial body such as a star at 10 parsecs in the V passband
 M-V, Japanese space rocket

Other uses
 MV, Roman numeral for 1005
 Market value, the price at which an asset would trade in a competitive auction setting
 "Moist Vagina", a song by grunge band Nirvana on their single All Apologies
 Music video, a production which combines a piece of music and video clips for artistic purposes
 Meaningful vote, on Brexit
 mezza voce ('half-voice') with subdued or moderated volume in a musical score